The 2000 WNBA season was the 4th season for the Sacramento Monarchs. The team made the WNBA Playoffs for the second consecutive season, but they were shortly swept by eventual champion Houston Comets in the first round.

Offseason

Expansion Draft
The following players were selected in the draft:
 Kate Starbird (3rd pick, Miami Sol)
 Molly Goodenbour (20th pick, Portland Fire)

WNBA Draft

Regular season

Season standings

Season schedule

Player stats

References

Sacramento Monarchs seasons
Sacramento
Sacramento Monarchs